Véronique de Viguerie (born in 1978) is a French photojournalist. She was noted for covering a story about an Afghan guerrilla group responsible for the Uzbin Valley ambush.

Biography 
Viguerie was born in 1978 in Toulouse. After obtaining a master's degree in Law in Paris, she turned to photography, undertaking studies in Great Britain. In 2002, she worked in the UK at the Lincolnshire Echo. In 2004, she went to Afghanistan working as a freelance photographer. She nearly died in a suicide attack on a cyber cafe in Kabul in May 2005. She lived in Kabul for 3 years, then began reporting from many countries, including Colombia, Iraq, Somalia, Pakistan, Guatemala, Mexico, Nigeria, Niger, Mali, India and Bangladesh.

In 2008, Paris-Match sent her back to Afghanistan to cover "the Afghan side, after the ambush." She managed to gain the trust of the Taliban, whom she had met before, and obtain their authorization to take photographs. The publication of these photographs caused an uproar in French public opinion. Also in 2008, she got notice for her pictures of Somalian pirates. Her 2009 story on the oil war in Nigeria was awarded the Photo Trophy and Public Prize by the Prix Bayeux-Calvados des correspondants de guerre (Bayeux-Calvados Awards for war correspondents) in 2010.

In 2006, she published her first book, Afghanistan, Regards Croises with journalist Marie Bourreau.
In 2011, she published Carnets de Reportages du XXIe siècle with journalist Manon Querouil.

Honours 
 Lagardere Grant for Young Talent in 2006
 Canon & AFJ Prize for Best Female Photojournalist during the Perpignan festival in 2006
 Best Young Photographer at the Scoop Festival in Angers in 2008
 Word Press Photo, 3rd Prize Contemporary Issues in 2009
 Best War photoreportage at Bayeux Festival in 2010
 Nikon Prize for the Best War Photoreportage at Bayeux Festival in 2010

Publications 
 With Marie Bourreau: 
 Afghanistan, Regards Croises, 2006. 
 With Manon Querouil:
 Carnets de reportages du XXIe siècle, 2011. 
 Profession reporters : Deux baroudeuses en terrain miné, 2015.

References

External links 
 
 Older website at photoshelter.com
 Veronique De Viguerie, Getty Images Reportage

20th-century French photographers
21st-century French photographers
1978 births
Living people
People from Carcassonne
French photojournalists
French women photographers
20th-century women photographers
21st-century women photographers
20th-century French women
21st-century French women
Women photojournalists